Salz is an Ortsgemeinde – a community belonging to a Verbandsgemeinde – in the Westerwaldkreis in Rhineland-Palatinate, Germany.

Geography

The community lies in the Westerwald, between Montabaur and Rennerod. It belongs to the Verbandsgemeinde of Wallmerod, a kind of collective municipality. Its seat is in the like-named town.

History
In 1150, Salz had its first documentary mention.

Politics

The municipal council is made up of 12 council members who were elected in a majority vote in a municipal election on 13 June 2004.

Culture and sightseeing

The Catholic parish church of St. Adelphus is a Romanesque basilica with a Late Gothic quire. Lying buried in the church is one of Ludwig van Beethoven’s grandfathers.

Economy and infrastructure

Just west of the community runs Bundesstraße 8, linking Limburg an der Lahn and Hennef. The nearest Autobahn interchange is Diez on the A 3 (Cologne–Frankfurt), some 13 km away. The nearest InterCityExpress stop is the railway station at Montabaur on the Cologne-Frankfurt high-speed rail line.

References

External links
 Salz in the collective municipality’s Web pages 

Municipalities in Rhineland-Palatinate
Westerwaldkreis